"Tight Fittin' Jeans" is a song written by Michael Huffman, and recorded by American country music artist Conway Twitty.  It was released in June 1981 as the first single from the album Mr. T.  The song was Twitty's 26th number one on the country chart.  The single stayed at number one for one week and spent a total of 10 weeks on the country chart.

The original album cut of the song did not feature any electric guitar leads; they were overdubbed for the single version after the album's release.

Charts

Certifications

References
 

1981 singles
1981 songs
Conway Twitty songs
Song recordings produced by Owen Bradley
MCA Records singles